Blue and John Crow Mountains National Park is a national park in Jamaica. The park covers 495.2 km2 and accounts for 4.5% of Jamaica's land surface. It gets its name from the Blue Mountains, the mountain range that runs through it, as well as a common bird found in the park, the "John crow" or turkey vulture (Cathartes aura). The park is globally known for its biodiversity. This park is the last of two known habitats of the giant swallowtail butterfly (Papilio homerus), the largest butterfly in the Western Hemisphere and also the habitat for the endangered Jamaican blackbird (Nesopsar nigerrimus), a refuge for the Jamaican boa (Chilabothrus subflavus) and the Jamaican hutia (Geocapromys brownii).

The park was inscribed to be a UNESCO World Heritage Site for mixed criteria (cultural and natural) on 3 July 2015.

References

External links
 
 Explore the Blue and John Crow Mountains in the UNESCO collection on Google Arts and Culture

National parks of Jamaica
Geography of Portland Parish
Tourist attractions in Portland Parish
Blue Mountains (Jamaica)